Ivka Tavčar (born 11 May 1909, date of death unknown) was a Yugoslav fencer. She competed in the women's individual foil event at the 1936 Summer Olympics.

References

External links
 

1909 births
Year of death missing
Yugoslav female foil fencers
Olympic fencers of Yugoslavia
Fencers at the 1936 Summer Olympics
Sportspeople from Ljubljana
Slovenian female foil fencers